Privredna banka Zagreb or PBZ is the second largest bank in Croatia (after Zagrebačka banka), owned by Intesa Sanpaolo group of Italy. The public shares were listed on the Zagreb Stock Exchange as one of 24 companies included in the CROBEX share index until they were delisted in 2021.

PBZ was established in 1966 on the basis and the banking tradition of The First Croatian Savings Bank, itself established in 1846 in Zagreb by the members of the Farming Association of Croatia and Slavonia. It began its transformation into a publicly traded company in the 1990s, and it was privatised in December 1999 when Banca Commerciale Italiana (BCI) acquired a 66.3 percent stake in it, with the Government of Croatia reducing its stake to 25 percent. In 2000 BCI merged with Banca Intesa and in January 2007 this bank merged again with Sanpaolo IMI to form the Intesa Sanpaolo group, which currently includes PBZ.

Many notable Croatian economists worked at PBZ, including former Governors of the Croatian National Bank (HNB) Željko Rohatinski (worked as bank's Chief Economist 1998–2000) and Marko Škreb (appointed PBZ Chief Economist in September 2007). Božo Prka, the bank's CEO since 1998, served as Finance Minister 1995–97 under Prime Minister Zlatko Mateša. Another former finance minister was Martina Dalić, who worked as Chief Economist at PBZ from 2000 to 2004.

PBZ received numerous awards in recognition of its powerhouse status in Croatia and the region by industry journals such as Euromoney magazine, Global Finance magazine and The Banker, and is also a three-time winner of the Croatian Chamber of Commerce "Golden Kuna" Award for Best Bank (2004, 2005 and 2010). Since 2006, Privredna banka Zagreb sponsors the annual PBZ Zagreb Indoors tennis tournament which is part of the ATP 250 series.

References

External links
 

Banks established in 1966
Banks based in Zagreb
Companies listed on the Zagreb Stock Exchange
1966 establishments in Croatia